Ice hockey tournaments have been staged at the Asian Winter Games since 1986. The men's tournament was introduced at the 1986 Asian Winter Games.

Summary

Men

Women

Medal table

Participating nations

Men

Women

List of medalists

References 
Sports123

 
Sports at the Asian Winter Games
Asian Games
Asian Games
Asian Games